Hypnotiq may refer to:

 Hpnotiq, a liqueur
 Hypnotiq (album), a 2008 album by Ewa Sonnet